is a series of video games developed and published by Capcom. It makes use of the historic figures that shaped Japan's history, retelling their stories with supernatural elements. Most of the games are of the action-adventure genre, a combination of third-person hack-and-slash combat and puzzle elements. The player protagonist wields the power of the Oni, enabling them to fight the Genma, the main enemy in the series.  the series has sold a total of 8.5 million units worldwide, making it Capcom's ninth best-selling franchise, behind Resident Evil, Monster Hunter, Street Fighter, Mega Man, Devil May Cry, Dead Rising, Marvel vs. Capcom, and Ace Attorney.

A high-definition remaster of the first game, Onimusha: Warlords, was released in December 2018 for the Nintendo Switch, PlayStation 4, and Xbox One. A Windows version was released in January 2019.

Games

The series originated in 1997, with Yoshiki Okamoto's idea to create Sengoku Biohazard, a ninja version of Capcom's own 1996 Resident Evil (known as Biohazard in Japan), set in the Sengoku period and featuring a "ninja house" filled with booby traps, similar to the mansion from Resident Evil, where battles would be fought using swords and shuriken: "The house will contain hidden doors behind walls, ceilings that fall down to you, scrolls and ninja magic, and many other ninja techniques". The project was originally intended for the Nintendo 64's 64DD.

Onimusha: Warlords was originally being developed for the original PlayStation, but the project was eventually moved to the PlayStation 2. The half-finished original PlayStation version of Onimusha was scrapped and never released.

The central character of the series, Samanosuke Akechi, is modeled after Takeshi Kaneshiro, who also voiced the character. People were used as models for other characters in the series, including Yūsaku Matsuda in Onimusha 2: Samurai's Destiny and Jean Reno in Onimusha 3: Demon Siege. Character movements throughout the series were created using motion capture.

The series was initially planned to be only a trilogy, but a fourth installment, Onimusha: Dawn of Dreams was released in 2006. Kenji Inafume said that Onimusha 3: Demon Siege is the end of the Nobunaga storyline, and Onimusha: Dawn of Dreams is a new storyline. In 2012, Capcom announced a browser-based game, Onimusha Soul, which was also scheduled to be released for the PlayStation 3 in Japan in 2014.

Gameplay
Although the protagonist changes in every Onimusha title, he is always a skilled swordsman who embarks on a set mission which involves slaying demons and fearsome enemies during the waning years of the Sengoku period of feudal Japan. In each game, the protagonist has the ability to absorb Genma souls from defeated enemies, which help to restore health, infuse power in weapons and armor, and provide power for the elemental attacks of special weapons.

The player controls their character using the D-pad (although later games such as Onimusha 3: Demon Siege and Onimusha: Dawn of Dreams introduced analog stick control) and travels in a fairly linear method, able to rotate slowly with the input of an opposing direction. Characters tend to move slowly and can only slightly increase their speed with the dash maneuver by tapping twice in any direction. Actions common to many action-oriented games, such as jumping, grabbing, and climbing over obstacles, cannot be performed in Onimusha games.

Onimusha is very action-oriented with an emphasis on combat, and employing some horror elements. The player has an arsenal of weaponry, ranging from katana to elemental-based broadswords. The player possesses a limited supply of spiritual energy which can be used for magical attacks. These magical attacks, which vary depending upon which weapon is equipped and other offensive attributes, can be improved throughout the game by accumulation of souls from defeated enemies.

Plot
Based primarily throughout the Japanese Sengoku period, Onimusha: Warlords starts with the feudal lord Nobunaga Oda being killed during a battle. One of the prominent fighters, Hidemitsu Samanosuke Akechi, receives a letter from his cousin Princess Yuki who is concerned about servants from her castle disappearing. Samanosuke joins with the kunoichi Kaede to rescue Yuki and discover demonic creatures known as Genma are the culprits. In order to defeat the Genma, the Oni clan grant Samanosuke powers from their kind. Across his fights Samanosuke discovers the Genma have resurrected Nobunaga into serving their needs while intending to sacrifice Yuki and an orphan named Yumemaru to grant him more powers. Samanosuke manages to save Yuki and Yumemaru and kills the Genma Lord, the God of Light Fortinbras. Samanosuke's group then takes different paths.

The sequel, Onimusha 2: Samurai's Destiny, has Nobunaga using the Genma in his forces to unify Japan, wiping out Yagyu village whose clan are Genma exterminators. The clan's only survivor, Jubei Yagyu, goes on a quest to avenge his clan while learning he inherited Oni powers from his mother as he uses them alongside the Oni's five orbs to battle Nobunaga's soldiers. Across his journey, Jubei meets several allies who also seek Nobunaga's life. Jubei manages to infiltrate Gifu castle and confronts Nobunaga alone. Although Jubei kills Nobunaga, the warlord's soul escapes and later reconstitutes himself. The spin-off Onimusha: Blade Warriors has the cast from Warlords and Samurai's Destiny in a new battle against Nobunaga's forces.

The third game, Onimusha 3: Demon Siege, has Samanosuke's clan attacking the Oda forces again. Before confronting Nobunaga, Samanosuke is transported to Modern Paris as a result of an experiment made by the Genma scientist Guildernstern to enable his kin to conquer more lands. In the meantime, service agent Jacques Blanc is a victim of Guildernstern while transported to Japan's Sengoku period. There, Jacques is granted oni powers by an oni who tells him to join forces with this timeline's Samanosuke and defeat Nobunaga if he wishes to return home. While Jacques aids Samanosuke in the past, in the future Samanosuke is helped by Jacques' family to investigate the Genma. In the end the two oni warriors are successful in stopping the invasion and return to their respective times. Samanosuke manages to slay Nobunaga and seal his soul within the Oni Gauntlet to avoid another resurrection.

The fourth game, Onimusha: Dawn of Dreams, had Nobunaga's servant Hideyoshi Toyotomi unified Japan with the Genma whom he supported in their actions. His illegitimate son, Hideyasu "Soki" Yuki, goes on a quest to defeat Hideyoshi and stop the Genma. He is aided by several other warriors including an elder Samanosuke who recognizes him as the Black Oni, the God of Darkness. After mastering his oni powers, Soki joins with his friends to defeat Hideyoshi's army. In the aftermath it is revealed that Hideyoshi was a puppet of the Genma Triumvirate who wish to resurrect Fortinbras at his full power as the Genmas' God of Light. Although the Genma Triumvirate and Hideyoshi are defeated, Fortinbras resurrects with Soki using the Oni Gauntlet to destroy the Genma and restore the country's peace at the cost of his life. Soon after, Samanosuke embarks on a quest to seal away the Oni Gauntlet to prevent Nobunaga from being released.

Main Characters
Samanosuke Akechi (明智 左馬之介 秀満 Akechi Samanosuke Hidemitsu), later also known under the moniker Tenkai Nankōbō during his appearance in Onimusha: Dawn of Dreams, is the main protagonist of the first and third installments in the Onimusha series: Onimusha: Warlords for the PlayStation 2, Xbox and Windows, and Onimusha 3: Demon Siege for the PlayStation 2 and Windows. He also appears as a supporting playable character in the fourth game Onimusha: Dawn of Dreams, and as one of the combatants in Onimusha: Blade Warriors, both on the PlayStation 2. He is loosely based on the historical figure, Akechi Hidemitsu. His in-game model is based and voiced by Takeshi Kaneshiro. Samanosuke is the only character to appear in all four mainline Onimusha games.  He appears in Onimusha 2 in a flashback drawing. 

Jūbei Yagyū is the main hero of Onimusha 2: Samurai's Destiny. As the first leader of the Yagyū clan seen in the series and originator of Shin-in style sword combat, he was born as Sougen but later given the name Jūbei as a child, a tradition which would continue as seen with his granddaughter. His father was the late Head of the Yagyū clan, who was seduced and had a child by a woman who disappeared shortly thereafter. Jūbei never knew his mother, but does meet his mother during the events of Onimusha 2: Samurai's Destiny. His in-game character is modeled after late Japanese actor Matsuda Yusaku.

Hideyasu "Sōki" Yūki is the main protagonist in Onimusha: Dawn of Dreams. He was the biological son of Ieyasu Tokugawa and a warrior who possesses the dark power of the Oni. He goes by many names besides Sōki and Hideyasu Yuki; Blue Demon and Oni of the Ash. Having Lamentation, his prized broadsword he learned about Hideyoshi's insidious scheme, he sets out on a journey to burn the Genma trees and defeat the Genma running rampant across the land. He is the first Onimusha main character to not be modeled after a actor. He is also the only main character to be killed, dying at the end of Onimusha: Dawn of Dreams after sacrificing himself to destroy the Oni Star. Soki has appeared as a playable character in Tatsunoko vs. Capcom: Ultimate All-Stars.

Jacques Blanc is one of two main protagonists (the other being Samanosuke Akechi) in Onimusha 3: Demon Siege. He is the first Westerner who wields the Oni Power, originating from France. He is modeled after French actor Jean Reno.

Nobunaga Oda (織田信長) is the main antagonist in the first three Onimusha games, in particular Onimusha 2: Samurai's Destiny and Onimusha 3: Demon Siege, where he is the final boss in those two games. In real world history, Nobunaga is viewed culturally as both a hero and as a villain for respectively trying to unite his nation during the Sengoku Period and the horrific lengths he took to achieve his goal. In this timeline he forms an alliance with the demons for power and to conquer Japan. Despite being killed at the beginning of Onimusha Warlords, he returns as a demon. He battles Jubei at the end of Onimusha 2: Samurai's Destiny but due to Jubei not having an Oni Gauntlet to seal his soul, his death was only temporary. He returns in Onimusha 3: Demon Siege after being revived by the demons again. he is finally killed by Samanosuke and sealed in his Oni Gauntlet. 

Fortinbras (フォーティンブラス), also referred to as the "God of Light", was the king and most powerful of all Genma. He appears as the final boss in Onimusha: Warlords and Onimusha: Dawn of Dreams. In Onimusha: Dawn of Dreams he is reveal to have two forms, a human form and a serpent form. He is finally killed by Soki after Soki sacrifices himself to stop the Oni Star.

Hideyoshi Toyotomi (豊臣 秀吉) is an antagonist who has appeared in every main game of the Onimusha series. Historically, Hideyoshi is the most famous peasant-samurai in Japan as he rose from being a vassal of Nobunaga Oda to the man who united Japan with his short-lived reign as regent. He is one of the main antagonist of Onimusha: Dawn of Dreams.

Reception

The Onimusha series has received overall positive reviews with most of the main games on the PlayStation 2, receiving average scores of more than 80%. As a comparison, most spin-offs from the series have not been as successful. The titles have influenced other games from the company including Devil May Cry, Shadow of Rome and Resident Evil 4. The samurai game Genji: Dawn of the Samurai was cited by Inafune as an "Onimusha clone" although its designer Yoshiki Okamoto denied such statement.

The series has often been compared with the Resident Evil series and has been praised for its focus in action. However, the first two games were criticized for forcing the player to use the Directional Pad rather than the left analogue to make the playable character to move. This issue was solved with the third release which generated a good response. Another subject of criticism is the length of each game with opinions sometimes differing due to the replay value they offer. Yoshinori Ono acknowledged the third game's short length and thus made Dawn of Dreams become the series' longest title.

The original game was a major hit on the PS2, becoming the console's first game to sell over a million copies. While Onimusha 2 was also a best selling titles Capcom noticed how it did poorly in European regions. The third and fourth titles received less favorable sales with Keiji Inafune addressing people's concerns about how the former game did not feel like a samurai story while various gaming journalists noted the latter was overshadowed by next generation consoles.
As December 31, 2019, the series has sold at least 8.3 million copies to date.

Adaptations

Canceled Film
In May 2003, Paramount Pictures, Davis Films and Gaga Productions announced its joint venture to adapt the Onimusha game series into a $50 million live-action feature film. According to Paramount and Davis Films' Samuel Hadida: "It's samurai fighting against demons – it's very close to this simple pitch. There's also a love story woven in. It's a big adventure movie with lots of special effects". He also proposed the possibility of a film franchise.

In December 2006, director Christophe Gans said that he had Onimusha lined up to film. The film, budgeted at over $70 million, was to begin production in China in February 2008 for a December 2009 release. It was reported that Takeshi Kaneshiro would be in the movie, reprising his role as Samanosuke. Hadida had to delay the filming of Onimusha, which has resulted in the film's Japanese cast working on other film projects during the delay, and being unavailable to start filming Onimusha. These factors meant that Gans would direct an adaptation of Leo Perutz's novel The Swedish Cavalier first. Satomi Ishihara and Tsuyoshi Ihara remained attached to the project. There has been no further news regarding this film since 2007, and any plans for a live action movie was quietly canceled.

Anime series
During Netflix's "Tudum" virtual event in late September 2022, it was announced that an anime series adaptation was in the works. It will be produced by Sublimation and directed by Shin'ya Sugai, with Takashi Miike as chief director. The main character, Musashi Miyamoto, will be modeled after Toshiro Mifune.

References

External links
 Official website of the series

 
Video game franchises
Action-adventure video games by series
Capcom franchises
Capcom beat 'em ups
Dark fantasy video games
Video games about demons
Video games about samurai
Video games set in feudal Japan
Video game franchises introduced in 2001
Cultural depictions of Oda Nobunaga
Hack and slash games
Hack and slash video games by series
Video games adapted into television shows